Yousof (Younnus, Younus) Safvat (born 15 February 1940 in Tehran - death 29 January 2003 in Tehran) was an Iranian chess player. He was the first official chess champion and national master of Iran.

He was a five-time winner of the Iranian Chess Championship (1955, 1956, 1957, 1959, 1965), and represented Iran in Chess Olympiads at Moscow 1956, Munich 1958, Varna 1962, Tel Aviv 1964, and Siegen 1970.

References

Iranian chess players
Chess Olympiad competitors
2003 deaths
1940 births
20th-century chess players